X-Beam Football Club is a football club based in Honiara, Solomon Islands. They play their home games at Lawson Tama Stadium.

Current squad 
as of August 2014

References 

Football clubs in the Solomon Islands
Honiara